Carter Girl is the tenth studio album by American country music singer Carlene Carter. It is her first release since 2008's Stronger, as well as her first album for Rounder Records. All twelve tracks on the album were written or co-written by a member of the Carter Family, with the majority being composed by Carlene's great-uncle A.P. Carter.

Reception 
Carter Girl received positive critical acclaim, with Robin Denselow from UK publication The Guardian giving the album 4 out of 5 stars and saying "[Carter] has done her justice to her history", highlighting how the songs of the Carter Family have been revived with "intensity and emotion", specifically on the track "Long Black Train" which Carter has given "new maturity". Denselow also praises producer Don Was who has "captured the energy [Carter] showed in the late 1970s when she recorded in London". Similarly, Rolling Stone Country reported that "the two original tracks on the record alone are worth the price of admission", calling Me And The Wildwood Rose a "sweetly moving tribute to Carter's grandparents, Maybelle and Ezra, told through childhood memories". Metacritic also chose Me And The Wildwood Rose as the top track from the album, which was rated 81 based on 10 reviews, indicating universal acclaim. Mojo called Carter Girl "unashamedly traditional, committed, personal and really quite perfect". The Boston Globe suggesting that "this may be the best album the Carter Girl has ever made". Similarly, AllMusic explained that "Carlene Carter has confronted the mightly legacy of the Carter Family songbook and allowed it to strengthen her music rather than buckling under its weight, and this ranks with her finest recorded work to date". Regarding the Carter Family, PopMatters state that Carter Girl is responsible for maintaining and extending their legacy "without falsehood or artifice of any kind". Blurt Magazine awarded the album 4 out of 5 stars, explaining that Carlene "long ago proved herself worthy of the family legacy", adding that "Carter Girl would be a highlight of her substantial discography regardless of a familial stamp".

Track listing

Personnel 
Credits adapted from AllMusic.

Jim Bessman – liner notes
Paul Blakemore – mastering
Joe Breen – background vocals
Sam Bush – mandolin
Carlene Carter – lead vocals, background vocals, acoustic guitar, piano, photography
Marina Chavez – photography
Bob Clearmountain – mixing
Jack Clement – acoustic guitar
Larissa Collins – art direction
Elizabeth Cook – harmony vocals (track 4), background vocals (tracks 1, 5, 6 and 10)
Greg Gartenbaum – engineering
Vince Gill – harmony vocals (track 8)
Rami Jaffee – keyboard, organ, piano
Jim Keltner – drums, percussion
Kris Kristofferson – duet vocals (track 11)
Greg Leisz – steel guitar, electric guitar, acoustic guitar
Tiffany Anastasia Lowe – personal assistant
Val McCallum – electric guitar
Blake Mills – acoustic guitar, electric guitar
Willie Nelson – duet vocals, guitar (track 7)
Mickey Raphael – harmonica
Matt Rausch – engineering
Sergio Ruelas Jr – mixing
Wesley Seidman – engineering
Ivy Skoff – production co-ordination
Donna Tracy – photography
Don Was – production, bass
Clinton Welander – engineering
Gerald Wenner – photography
Chris Wilkinson – engineering
Howard Willing – engineering

The Carter Family – duet and harmony vocals (track 10)
Anita Carter
Helen Carter
June Carter Cash
Lorrie Carter Bennett
Johnny Cash

References 

2014 albums
Carlene Carter albums
Albums produced by Don Was
Rounder Records albums